Kielanodon is an extinct mammal of the Portuguese Upper Jurassic. It was a relatively early member of the also extinct order of Multituberculata. It eked out a living during the Mesozoic era, also known as the "Age of the Dinosaurs." It is in the suborder Plagiaulacida, family Paulchoffatiidae.

The genus Kielanodon, meaning "Kielan’s tooth" after Zofia Kielan-Jaworowska, was named by Hahn G. in 1987. The main species, Kielanodon hopsoni, also named by Hahn, is known from fossils found in the Kimmeridgian (Upper Jurassic)-age strata of Guimarota, Portugal. The identification is based on three upper jaws.

References 
 Hahn (1987), Neue Beobachtungen zum Schädel- und Gebiss-Bau der Paulchoffatiidae (Multituberculata, Ober-Jura). Paleovertebrata 17 p. 155-196, 5 plates.
(New observations on the skull and jaw constructions in Paulchoffatiidae (Multituberculata, Upper Jurassic)).
 Hahn G & Hahn R (2000), Multituberculates from the Guimarota mine, p. 97-107 in Martin T & Krebs B (eds), Guimarota - A Jurassic Ecosystem, Verlag Dr Friedrich Pfeil, München.
 Kielan-Jaworowska Z & Hurum JH (2001), Phylogeny and Systematics of multituberculate mammals. Paleontology 44, p. 389-429.
 Much of this information has been derived from  Multituberculata Cope, 1884.

Multituberculates
Late Jurassic mammals of Europe
Fossils of Portugal
Prehistoric mammal genera
Fossil taxa described in 1987